Lawford is a large village and civil parish in the Tendring district of northeast Essex, England. Mistley merges with the east side of Manningtree. Lawford has two junior schools, Lawford Church of England Primary School and Highfields Primary School, situated near Manningtree High School.

The 14th-century parish Church of St Mary is a Grade I listed building.

Ogilvie Hall is the name of the village hall on Wignall Street, and there is a more modern facility called The Venture Centre off Bromley Road. 

The Leftley Housing estate, situated towards the east of the village, is a typical 1960s development of mainly semi-detached houses and bungalows.

More recent housing developments include the Summers park and Lawford Dale housing estates constructed by Rose builders, and Manningtree Park, which as of 2023 is currently under construction. 

The area includes a number of smallholdings originally built by the Land Settlement Association.

References

External links

 Lawford Parish Council
 Lawford C of E Primary School
 Lawford Football Club

Villages in Essex
Civil parishes in Essex
Manningtree